Mathieu Rivest is a Canadian politician, who was elected to the National Assembly of Quebec in the 2022 Quebec general election. He represents the riding of Côte-du-Sud as a member of the Coalition Avenir Québec.

Prior to his election to the legislature, Rivest was director of Camp Musical St-Alexandre, a music education camp for children.

References

21st-century Canadian politicians
Coalition Avenir Québec MNAs
People from Bas-Saint-Laurent
French Quebecers
Living people
Year of birth missing (living people)